Swordfish Translation Editor is a Computer-assisted translation software.

Features 
It works with the XLIFF standard, after having extracted texts from a variety of file format. It stores translation memory in an internal database and can export it in the standard TMX format; import is also possible. A server, RemoteTM, can be used instead of the internal database if sharing is needed.

It supports the following localization industry standards:
 Unicode
 XLIFF (XML Localisation Interchange File Format)
 TMX (Translation Memory eXchange)
 SRX (Segmentation Rules eXchange)
 xml:tm
 PO (Portable Object)
 TBX (TermBase eXchange)

Supported File Formats - MS Office 2000-2003:
 RTF (Rich Text Format)

Supported File Formats - MS Office 2007:
 DOCX 
 XLSX 
 PPTX

Supported File Formats - MS Office 2010:
 DOCX
 XLSX
 PPTX

Supported File Formats - Open Office:
 ODT
 ODS
 ODP

Supported File Formats - Web Files:
 HTML
 XML
 RESX

Supported File Formats - Text:
 TXT
 CSV
 TAB

Supported File Formats - Desktop Publishing:
 MIF (FrameMaker)
 XML (FrameMaker)
 INX (InDesign)
 IDML (InDesign)

Supported File Formats - Graphical Applications:
 SVG (Photoshop)
 SVG (Illustrator)
 SVG (CorelDraw)

Supported File Formats - Source Code and Binary Files:
 RC
 Java: properties
 ResX

Supported File Formats - other: 
 DITA maps

Open API: Yes
Has a command line interface for using main features in batch mode.

Source: TAUS Tracker, http://www.taustracker.com/54/92-swordfish-translation-editor

See also 
 Translation memory
 Computer-assisted Translation
 DeepL
 vidby

References

External links 
Product Page

Translation software
Software-localization tools